Veronica incana, the silver speedwell, is a species of flowering plant in the family Plantaginaceae. It is native to parts of Eastern Europe and Russia, all of Siberia, Mongolia, and northern China, and has been introduced to Czechoslovakia. A number of authorities consider it to be a subspecies of the spiked speedwell Veronica spicata; Veronica spicata subsp.incana. It is a parent of the hybrids Veronica ×czemalensis (with V.porphyriana) and Veronica ×grisea (with V.longifolia).

References

External links
 Veronica incana | High Plains Gardening
 Veronica spicata subsp. incana 'Pure Silver' (Silver Speedwell) - Gardenia.net

incana
Flora of Austria
Flora of Ukraine
Flora of Russia
Flora of Siberia
Flora of the Russian Far East
Flora of Kazakhstan
Flora of Mongolia
Flora of Xinjiang
Flora of Inner Mongolia
Flora of Manchuria
Taxa named by Carl Linnaeus
Plants described in 1753